Kingak Island is an island located within Coronation Gulf, south of Victoria Island, in the Kitikmeot Region, Nunavut, Canada.

Other islands in the vicinity include Anchor Island, Duke of York Archipelago, Hokagon Island, Kabviukvik Island, Mangak Island, Nanortut Island, Nanukton Island, and Takhoalok Island.

References

Islands of Coronation Gulf
Uninhabited islands of Kitikmeot Region